Dato' Mohd Shamsudin Lias (born 15 December 1953) is a Malaysian politician who has served as Member of the Selangor State Legislative Assembly (MLA) for Sungai Burong since March 2004. He served as State Leader of the Opposition of Selangor from June 2013 to his resignation in December 2014. He is a member of the United Malays National Organisation (UMNO), a component party of the Barisan Nasional (BN) state opposition but federal ruling coalition.

Personal life
He is married with 5 children. He is currently living with his family in Tanjong Karang, Selangor Darul Ehsan.

Education
Shamsudin has a master's degree in Urban and Regional planning from Syracuse University in New York State, USA.

Chairman of the Public Accounts Committee
In 2010, Shamsudin was appointed as Chairman of the Public Accounts Committee (PAC) even though the state of Selangor was governed by Pakatan Rakyat (PR) and he was a member of Barisan Nasional (BN) which was opposing PR. He was praised by the former Menteri Besar of Selangor from PR, Khalid Ibrahim by saying that "Mohd Shamsudin is a capable person as he has experience in state administration given his experience as a former district officer". In 2014, he stepped down as the State Opposition Leader as he no longer wanted to helm the PAC, protesting against the lack of representation and power of BN and the Opposition in the committee.

Election results

Honours
  :
  Knight Commander of the Order of the Crown of Selangor (DPMS) – Dato' (2007)

References

1953 births
People from Selangor
Living people
United Malays National Organisation politicians
Malaysian Muslims
Malaysian people of Malay descent
Syracuse University alumni
Members of the Selangor State Legislative Assembly
Leaders of the Opposition in the Selangor State Legislative Assembly
Knights Commander of the Order of the Crown of Selangor